"A Night to Remember" was the third single released in North America and Australia from the album of the same name by Cyndi Lauper.  It was not released as a single in Europe.

A music video was made of the song. It featured shots of Lauper on stage performing the song with her band as well as shots of Lauper on the beach.

The song is about a break-up where the heartbroken protagonist reminisces about a romantic affair with a departed lover.

Chart performance

Track listing
Australian 7" / US Cassette
A. "A Night To Remember" (Eric Thorngren Remix) – 3:43
B. "Insecurious" – 3:30

The Single Remix features new re-recorded vocals.

References

1989 singles
Cyndi Lauper songs
Songs written by Cyndi Lauper
1989 songs
Songs written by Franke Previte
Epic Records singles
Songs about nights